Akkihebbalu  is a Hobli headquarters in the southern state of Karnataka, India. It is located in the Krishnarajpet taluk of Mandya district in Karnataka.

It has an 800 year old Lakshmi Narasimha Swamy temple constructed by Goutama Maharshi. Rathotsava is celebrated every year in the month of February. Near to that a very old Eeshwara temple (Konkaneshwara) is located.

Akkihebbalu is well connected by bus and trains to Mysore, Hassan, Mandya Bangalore and other cities. It is located 70 km from Mandya, 60 km from Mysore, 65 km from Hassan  and 170 km from Bangalore.

 Mandya
 Districts of Karnata

Image gallery

References

External links
 http://Mandya.nic.in/

Villages in Mandya district